Ribeira da Prata is a town in the northern part of the island of Santiago, Cape Verde belonging to the municipality of Tarrafal. In 2010 its population was 1,009. It was mentioned as Rivera de Prata in the 1747 map by Jacques-Nicolas Bellin.

References

Geography of Santiago, Cape Verde
Populated coastal places in Cape Verde
Towns in Cape Verde
Tarrafal Municipality